Vonges is a commune in the Côte-d'Or department in eastern France.

The commune is known for the Poudrerie nationale de Vonges (Vonges National Powder Mill), a powder mill established in 1691 and still operating as of 2012.

Population

See also
Communes of the Côte-d'Or department

References

Communes of Côte-d'Or